Kshamisi Nimma Khaatheyalli Hanavilla is a 2022 Indian Kannada-language drama directed by Vinayaka Kodsara. The cinematography is done by Nanda Kishore. The film stars Diganth, Ranjani Raghavan and Aindrita Ray. The music is composed by Prajwal Pai.

Plot 

The story revolves around Shankara played by Diganth who losses his amount of Rs.2300 by swiping his debit card at petrol bank unknowingly twice. In order to get the money back he goes to main branch of the bank situated in Bengaluru. There he meets Aindritha who is working as a junior lawyer. Initially she hesitates to take the case as she was expecting a higher case but later accepts to fight for the justice when she faces the same situation as Shankara. Will they win the case?is the climax. In between there is a failed love story of Shankara with Sowmya played by Ranjani Raghavan.

Cast 
Diganth as Shankara 
Ranjani Raghavan as Sowmya 
Aindrita Ray as Padmavathi
Vidya Murthy as Shankara's mother
Prakash Thuminad as Bank Manager
Umashree as Senior Lawyer (Guest appearance)
Satish Das as debit card manager.

Soundtrack 
The soundtrack album has three singles composed by Prajwal Pai, and released on Lahari Music.

Release and reception
The film was released on 29 April 2022. It was also released on Amazon Prime Video.

B Somashekar of The Times of India gave a positive review for the film, writing: "The story [,,] which doesn't have chest-thumping dialogues or mass elements, thrives solely on the content. Kudos to director Vinayaka Kodsara for taking up such a subject." A review from Udayavani appreciated the performances but felt that the film could have been better paced in the first half. On the other hand, OTT Play Prathibha Joy criticized the film calling it "complete waste of two hours."

References

External links 
 

Indian drama films
2020s Kannada-language films
2022 films
Films shot in Karnataka
2022 drama films